The Massachusetts House of Representatives 1st Hampshire District or "1st Hampshire" is an electoral district for the Massachusetts House of Representatives. It consists of the municipalities Northampton, Chesterfield, Cummington, Goshen, Hatfield, Plainfield, Westhampton, Williamsburg, and Worthington. Democrat Lindsay Sabadosa of Northampton has represented the district since 2019.

The current district geographic boundary overlaps with those of the Massachusetts Senate's Berkshire, Hampden, Franklin and Hampshire district and Hampshire, Franklin and Worcester district.

District History
The district has existed in its current form since November 4, 2021, but has existed in name since at least 1970.

Former locales
The district previously covered:
 Southampton and Montgomery, 1970s-2021
 Easthampton, circa 1872 
 Huntington, circa 1872

Representatives
 William H. Dickinson, circa 1859 
 William F. Arnold, circa 1859 
 Calvin Coolidge, circa 1908 - later Governor of Massachusetts and Vice President then President of the United States
 Michael Fitzgerald, circa 1918
 William Grant, circa 1920 
 James O'Dea, circa 1923
 Edwin Olander, circa 1935
 Jeremiah Lucey, circa 1945
 John O'Rourke, circa 1953
 Louis Morini, circa 1967

Elections
Election data comes from Massachusetts Election Statistics.

2018

2016

2014

2012

2010

2008

See also
 Other Hampshire County districts of the Massachusetts House of Representatives: 2nd, 3rd
 Hampshire County districts of the Massachusett Senate: Berkshire, Hampshire, Franklin, and Hampden; 1st Hampden and Hampshire; 2nd Hampden and Hampshire; Hampshire, Franklin and Worcester
 List of former districts of the Massachusetts House of Representatives

Images

References

Further reading

External links

 League of Women Voters of Northampton Area
 Amherst League of Women Voters

House Hampshire 01
Government of Hampshire County, Massachusetts
Government of Hampden County, Massachusetts